The Crim Festival of Races is an annual road running event with several races and walking events. The Crim has been held in August in Flint, Michigan since 1977. It draws runners from around the world from countries such as Kenya, Russia, and Ukraine. The race attracts approximately 50,000 people each year. The festival is one of the Flint Parade of Festivals.

The races and walks are Michigan Mile Series, 5K, 5 Mile, 10 Mile, the Teddy Bear Trot and Lois Craig Invitational Special Olympics Race.

The race has hosted the United States national 10-mile championship race on two occasions. The 2009 women's U.S. title was won by Molly Huddle, while the 2010 men's title was won by Fasil Bizuneh.

History
Bobby Crim, then speaker of the state house, and Lois Craig, Crim's administrative assistant, were looking for a fundraiser in 1976 for the Special Olympics program that was just starting up. The fourth Saturday in August 1977 was selected with a start time of Noon with Craig serving as race director. That first Bobby Crim Road Race had 707 runners and raised $30,170 for Special Olympics. While expecting to be a one time event, Crim wished to continue the event to raise more money.

In 1979, the race had 34,000 from all over the world. In 1985, race organization was incorporated as The Crim Road Race, Inc. to increase the number of charities assisted. Additional races were added in 1987, the 8K Race and in 1988, the 5K Family Walk and Teddy Bear Trot. From 1989 to 1992, the Crim 8K Walk, the Friday night concert the night before, carnival rides and post-event entertainment were added.

Crim Festival of Races
In 1992, the Road Race event was renamed along with its corporate organization to Crim Festival of Races. The Festival continued to expand adding a one-mile run, 8K race/walk, 5K run, Competitive Walk, Neighborhood Running Clubs, Crim Kids Classic, the Crim Training Program, Beyond 2000 community fitness Program and The Feelin’ Good Mileage Club school fitness program between 1992 and 2008. With the 1993 event raising $1.3 million, Craig stepped down as race director to go to work for Area 13 Special Olympics. A Special Olympics race that is held as a part of the Festival on Friday was named in Craig's honor, the Lois Craig Invitational Special Olympics Race.

In 2013, the Michigan Mile Series was moved from Saturday to Friday night before the rest of the races with a separate heat for professionals, the Professional Mile, with a purse of $10,000 and a new course going around the University of Michigan–Flint.

Due to Flint River remediation work in 2017, the 10 mile race route had well-received changes. For the 2018 festival, the 8K race/walk was replaced with a 5 mile race or true "half Crim". Routes of the 5 mile and the 5K races will overlap more with the 10 mile as to reduce traffic issues adding the Chevy Commons and Mott Park neighborhood. While the 10 mile route would retain the 2017 changes.

Past winners
Key:

 † = The 1988 course was 10 meters short of the official 10-mile race distance

Crim Fitness Foundation

The Crim Fitness Foundation (CFF), formerly The Crim Road Races, Inc. and Crim Festival of Races, Inc., is a 501(c)3 non-profit promoting fitness in Genesee County, Michigan and is the operator of the Crim Festival of Races. The Foundation grew out of the race organizing group of the Crim 10 mile race.

History
Bobby Crim, then speaker of the state house, and Lois Craig, Crim's assistant, started the Crim as a 10-mile race in 1977. The early years' planning committee of 14 volunteers was known as the Kitchen Cabinet by Craig. In 1985, race organization was incorporated as The Crim Road Race, Inc. to increase the number of charities assisted. Big Brother/Big Sisters of Greater Flint, Fair Winds Girl Scouts, Shelter of Flint, Genesee County Literacy Coalition and the Crim Youth Development Program were some of the charities assisted.

In 1992, the multi-race Crim Road Race event is renamed along with its corporate organization to Crim Festival of Races. In 1994, the first annual Crim Kids Classic was run. In 1997, Marti Austin was hired as youth development coordinator to run the Kids Classic.
In the early 2000s, the Crim Training Program designed the Hurley Foundation's Tuuri races as an official training races.

Fitness Foundation
In October 2005, the Crim Festival of Races, Inc. changed its name to the Crim Fitness Foundation, Inc.

On April 16, 2008, the Crim Foundation signed a purchase agreement for the Character Inn, a 16-story former Hyatt Regency hotel. With the owners not signing off on the purchase, the Foundation transferred the  option to buy to the CS Mott Foundation.

Oakland County Executive L. Brooks Patterson proposed a half marathon modeled after the Crim Festival in his 2007 State of the County address. After losing his son, Brooks Stuart Patterson, the half marathon was named Brooksie Way Half Marathon with the Crim Foundation coming on board to help run the road race with the first held October 5, 2008. In 2009, two new 5K races were run in Flint, Start Heart in May and Auburn Hills, Michigan, Glenda's Glide in June. After the 2011 Brooksie Way, the Foundation ended its contract to run the event.

In 2010, the Hurley Foundation ran its last Tuuri road race with some interest in the Foundation in taking over the race, but was replaced without CFF taking over in 2011 by the Atwood Stadium Road Race on the calendar and as a vouchered race for the Crim Training Program.

On May 20, 2012, the Crim races expanded with "The Qualifier" event in Midland and Bay City added to the Dow Run/Walk to become the Dow Weekend of Races, however the Foundation was not involved in 2013 when the race became the Great Lakes Bay Marathons. On July 22, the Foundation ran the third annual Le Champion Pave bike race downtown taking over from the bike race organizer of Le Champion Pave and the Maillot Jaune Bicycle Road Race.

On May 11, 2013, the CFF held the first annual Health Plus Tour de Crim bicycle/obstacle challenge to give non-runners a taste of what the 10 mile Crim course is like. With the June 2013, the Crim Kids Classic was renamed the Marti Austin Kids Classic.

The Foundation wanted a race during the winter months to promote year-round fitness, so they started the Run Your Ice Off 5K race as the first race of the Grass Roots Race Series to take place during the Fire and Ice Festival in Downtown Flint starting with the second festival on February 22, 2014. Additional Grass Roots Races Series events were to be scheduled in June, July and September, each with different themes and to lead up to the Crim Festival. The festival itself will be adding the Crim Half, running the 10 mile and 5K to make a half marathon. Its Grass Roots Series by January 2014 pick up the Huckleberry Hustle, a July race, from the Genesee County Parks and Recreation Commission. The In Your Face Steeplechase had its inaugural run with 100 "people turned out" on June 26 for this race with obstacles run in conjunction with and AS a fundraiser for Mott Community College cross country team.

A Bobby Crim statue was created and installed the weekend before the 2014 Festival of Races north of the finish line on Saginaw Street. 

In 2018, the foundation began managing CANUSA Games' finances. The Ally Challenge and CANUSA Games organizations and the foundation agreed to start holding a 5K race, CANUSA 5K Challenge.

Crim race series
Marti Austin Kids Classic (May/June; formerly Crim Kids Classic) races: Diaper Dash, Toddler Trot, the Quarter Mile, Half Mile, and One Mile and is nicknamed "mini-Crim"
Tour de Crim (May) - bike ride/obstacle challenge along the 10 mile Crim race path
Grass Roots Race Series, Crim's low cost "fun" series:
Run Your Ice Off fun run/walk. First held on February 22, 2014 in conjunction with the Fire and Ice Festival and took place on the Flint River Trail but started and ended on the UM-Flint campus. Participation was limited to 350 for the first year 
In Your Face Steeplechase (June 26, 2014) 3 mile run on a 1-mile loop at Pierce Park with obstacles like steep hills, hay bales and mud spots with viewer participation welcome and a fundraiser for Mott Community College's cross country team
Huckleberry Hustle & Little Berry Dash, (July 10, 2014) This  5K trail run/walk was pick up in its 11th year from Genesee County Parks and occurs at Crossroads Village.
Crim Festival of Races (August) 5K, Half Crim, "The Crim" 10 Mile, the Crim Half (half marathon run using the 10 mile and 5K races) and the Teddy Bear Trot
Lois Craig Invitational Special Olympics Race (Friday)
Michigan Mile Race Series (Friday) original Saturday at its inaugural running
 CANUSA 5K Challenge (September) The Ally Challenge, CANUSA Games organization and the foundation agreed to start holding a 5K race, CANUSA 5K Challenge, in conjunction with the golf tournament in September 2019 at Warwick Hills to benefit the CANUSA Games.

Former race events
The Brooksie Way Half Marathon & 5K (2008- 2011)
Genesee County Start Heart Walk and Crim 5k, 5K (5/30/2009, 5/22/2010) Flint
Glenda's Glide, 5K run/walk (06/27/2009, 06/26/2010) Auburn Hills, Michigan
The Qualifier (2012) This event has two races, A half and full marathon, both of which will start at Dow Diamond in Midland, and end in downtown Bay City at the intersection of Midland and Dean. The Qualifiers are both part of a larger event called the Dow Weekend of Races with their addition to the Dow Run/Walk races in their 27th year. The race is called the Qualifier as it is line up to serve as a qualifying race for the major marathon races, Boston, New York and Chicago. Currently called the Great Lakes Bay Marathons not affiliated with the foundation.
Le Champion Pave Criterium (2010-2012) 3rd annual bicycle races of varying distances held on July 22, 2012. The event was named after Albert Champion, a road bicycle racer and founder of AC Spark Plug.

References

External links
Crim Fitness Foundation official website
Running Times
Cool Running
2007 Results
Le Champion Pave.com at archive.org
Le Champion Pave at crim.org at archive.org
Don't be fooled by relatively easy start to Brooksie Way half marathon course - Flint Journal writer/runner's description of the race course
 Actual Finish Line

Sports in Flint, Michigan
Road running competitions in the United States
10-mile runs
Tourist attractions in Genesee County, Michigan
Recurring sporting events established in 1977
Track and field in Michigan